Kalleh Kavi (also Romanized as Kalleh Kāvī; also known as Kaleh Gāvī and Kalleh Gāvī) is a village in Kani Bazar Rural District, Khalifan District, Mahabad County, West Azerbaijan Province, Iran. At the 2006 census, its population was 225, in 37 families.

References 

Populated places in Mahabad County